Buffalo Pass may refer to:
 Buffalo Pass (South Africa), a pass of the Eastern Cape
 Buffalo Pass (Hong Kong), a pass near Buffalo Hill in Hong Kong
 Buffalo Pass (Arizona), a pass in Apache County, Arizona, United States.
 Buffalo Pass (Continental Divide), a mountain pass on the Continental Divide of the Americas in the Park Range of Colorado, United States.
 Buffalo Pass (Jackson County, Colorado), a mountain pass in Jackson County, Colorado, United States.
 Buffalo Pass (Washington), a pass in Okanogan County, Washington, United States.

See also